The Potomac Mills was a mill complex located along the Potomac River roughly  downriver of Shepherdstown. Built in 1826, the complex was originally used as a gristmill. In 1829, the mill began producing cement for the Chesapeake and Ohio Canal's construction. The factory continued to produce cement after the canal opened, and it shipped its product along the canal to other cities. Flooding and drought conditions in the 1880s led the mill to reduce its operations, and by 1901 the mill closed permanently.

The remaining buildings from the mill occupy an  site and are mostly in ruins. The buildings include the main mill building, several lime kilns, a headrace wall, and an office building. The stone foundation of the mill's dam, which extends across the river into Washington County, Maryland, is also still part of the site. The mill site was added to the National Register of Historic Places on February 5, 2014.

References

External links

, at Maryland Historical Trust

National Register of Historic Places in Jefferson County, West Virginia
Historic American Engineering Record in Maryland
Historic American Engineering Record in West Virginia
Agricultural buildings and structures on the National Register of Historic Places in West Virginia
Buildings and structures in Washington County, Maryland
Industrial buildings completed in 1826
Grinding mills in West Virginia
Cement companies of the United States
1826 establishments in Virginia
Grinding mills on the National Register of Historic Places in Maryland
Lime kilns in the United States